The City of Port Melbourne was a local government area about  southwest of Melbourne, the state capital of Victoria, Australia, on the south bank of the Yarra River.

The council area covered the current boundaries of the suburb of Port Melbourne; the Yarra River to the west and north, Boundary Street to the northeast, Hobsons Bay to the south and Pickles Street to the east.

History

Port Melbourne was first incorporated as the Sandridge Borough on 13 July 1860. It was renamed Port Melbourne on 25 January 1884, and became a town on 20 January 1893. It was proclaimed a city on 14 May 1919.

The Labor Party normally dominated the council. In 1992, Lyn Allison was elected to the council as an Independent, a position she held until 1994. Allison was later elected as a member of the Australian Senate, and she also served as Leader of the Australian Democrats.

On 22 June 1994, the City of Port Melbourne was abolished, and along with the Cities of South Melbourne and St Kilda, was merged into the newly created City of Port Phillip.

The council met at the Port Melbourne Town Hall, at Bay Street and Spring Street, Port Melbourne. The facility is now used as a municipal library by the City of Port Phillip.

Wards

The City of Port Melbourne was divided into three wards, each electing three councillors:
 Boundary Ward
 Centre Ward
 Sandridge Ward

Population

* Estimate in the 1958 Victorian Year Book.

References

External links
 Victorian Places - Port Melbourne

Port Melbourne
1860 establishments in Australia
1994 disestablishments in Australia
City of Port Phillip